The women's heptathlon event at the 2006 World Junior Championships in Athletics was held in Beijing, China, at Chaoyang Sports Centre on 18 and 19 August.

Medalists

Results

Final
18/19 August

Participation
According to an unofficial count, 23 athletes from 16 countries participated in the event.

References

Heptathlon
Combined events at the World Athletics U20 Championships